Norfolk North was a federal electoral district represented in the House of Commons of Canada from 1867 to 1904.  It was located in the province of Ontario. It was created by the British North America Act of 1867, which divided the county of Norfolk into two ridings. The North Riding consisted of the Townships of Middleton, Townsend, and Windham, and the Town of Simcoe.

In 1882, the town of Tilsonburg, and the village of Waterford were added to the ridings, and the Town of Simcoe was removed.

The electoral district was abolished in 1903 when it was merged into Norfolk riding.

Electoral history

|- 
  
|Conservative
|Aquila Walsh   
|align="right"| 1,026    
 
|Unknown
|Dr. Duncombe    
|align="right"| 990   

|- 
  
|Liberal
|John M. Charlton  
|align="right"|1,324   
  
|Conservative
|Aquila Walsh   
|align="right"|  1,274    
|}

|- 
  
|Liberal
|John M. Charlton      
|align="right"| 1,434   
 
|Unknown
|D. Tisdale   
|align="right"|1,264   
|}

|- 
  
|Liberal
|John M. Charlton  
|align="right"| 1,492   
  
|Conservative
|Aquila Walsh   
|align="right"| 1,348    
|}

|- 
  
|Liberal
|CHARLTON, John   
|align="right"| 1,940   
  
|Conservative
|SINCLAIR, L.C.   
|align="right"| 1,562    
|}

|- 
  
|Liberal
|CHARLTON, John    
|align="right"| 2,139   
  
|Conservative
|SINCLAIR, Lachlan C.   
|align="right"| 1,861    
|}

|- 
  
|Liberal
|CHARLTON, John   
|align="right"| 2,370   
  
|Conservative
|SINCLAIR, Lachlin   
|align="right"| 1,902    
|}

|- 
  
|Liberal
|CHARLTON, John    
|align="right"|  2,142   
 
|Patrons of Industry
|MCGUIRE, Wm.   
|align="right"| 1,598  
|}

|- 
  
|Liberal
|CHARLTON, John    
|align="right"| acclaimed   
|}

See also 

 List of Canadian federal electoral districts
 Historical federal electoral districts of Canada

References

External links 

 Website of the Parliament of Canada

Former federal electoral districts of Ontario
Norfolk County, Ontario
1867 establishments in Ontario
1904 disestablishments in Ontario
Constituencies disestablished in 1904